The Blue Nile were a Scottish band which originated in Glasgow. The group's early music was built heavily on synthesizers and electronic instrumentation and percussion, although later works featured guitar more prominently. Following early championing by established artists such as Rickie Lee Jones and Peter Gabriel (the band later worked with both acts), the Blue Nile gained critical acclaim, particularly for its first two albums A Walk Across the Rooftops and Hats, and some commercial success in both the UK and the US, which led to the band working with a wide range of musicians from the late 1980s onwards.

The Blue Nile's highest chart placement came when "Tinseltown in the Rain" reached No. 28 in the Netherlands in 1984, their only Dutch charting song. The band has had four top 75 hits on the UK Singles Chart, the highest being "Saturday Night" which reached No. 50 in 1991. In the United States, "The Downtown Lights" was its only chart entry, peaking at No. 10 on Billboard's Alternative Songs chart.

The band members have also gained a reputation for their avoidance of publicity, their idiosyncratic dealings with the recording industry and their perfectionism and slow work rate, which has resulted in the release of just four albums since the group's formation in 1981. The group appears to have disbanded since the release of the fourth album High in 2004, although there has never been any official confirmation.

In 2006, Buchanan had a top 10 hit in the UK when he featured on Texas' song, "Sleep", which reached No. 6.

History

Early years
Paul Buchanan (born 16 April 1956, Edinburgh, Scotland) and his childhood friend Robert Bell grew up together in Glasgow and both attended the University of Glasgow in the late 1970s, Buchanan gaining a degree in literature and medieval history, Bell in mathematics. Buchanan's civil servant father had been a semi-professional musician and had musical instruments in the house, but it was only after he and Bell had graduated that Buchanan began to think seriously about a career in music.

Although Buchanan had grown up in the same neighbourhood as Paul Joseph "PJ" Moore, they only became well acquainted at university, where Moore was studying electronics, and the three friends became part of a band, first known as McIntyre (named after the John McIntyre Building, the university's administrative offices) and then Night by Night, although Buchanan later commented that Night by Night only played "twice, maybe three times" in it short existence. The band struggled to retain a settled line-up and, by 1981, Buchanan, Bell and Moore were the only remaining members. They decided not to recruit anybody else, trading in a guitar for an effect pedal and borrowing an old drum machine that only played Hispanic American music rhythms. Buchanan later recalled, "We went and gigged, because we needed the money, we'd do gigs where we'd do cover versions with the cassette of Latin American rhythms. And we were terrible. But we picked songs that were so completely durable and well known that people recognized them. No matter how badly we mangled them."

Renaming themselves the Blue Nile (after the title of the 1962 book by Alan Moorehead), the group managed to raise enough money to record and release its first single, "I Love This Life", on their own Peppermint Records label. Only a limited number were produced, but one found its way to RSO Records via their friend and engineer Calum Malcolm. Malcolm had been a member of short-lived Edinburgh punk band The Headboys who had released their records on the RSO label, and he still had contacts with the company. RSO licensed the single for distribution, but almost as soon as the record was released RSO went bankrupt and was absorbed into the PolyGram recording company, and the single consequently disappeared.

A Walk Across the Rooftops (1982–1984)
Undaunted by this setback, they continued to play gigs around Glasgow, starting to write their own songs alongside the cover versions they were playing. Having no drummer and with limited musical ability, particularly in Buchanan's guitar playing (he later admitted that "we could play a little, but I was the worst by a long way"), the newly formed Blue Nile adopted an atmospheric, electronic approach primarily out of pragmatism. The band also made the most of their imagination, thrift and mechanical ingenuity. Buchanan recalled, "PJ had bought a tray from a waiter. It was made of zinc and it made a good noise when you hit it. We sampled it and PJ made a pad to trigger it from for £3. It was all very primitive back then — you had to hit it about two seconds before you wanted the sound to appear in the song."

The most commonly told story about the Blue Nile is that in 1983 they were approached by a local hi-fi manufacturer, Linn Products, and asked to produce a song that would showcase the Linn equipment to best effect. Linn was so pleased with the resulting record that it offered the Blue Nile a contract to make a whole album, and set up its own record label specifically to release it.

In interviews, both Buchanan and Moore have categorically denied that Linn approached the band to make a record for them, or that the record company influenced the album's sound in any way at all, with Moore saying, "It was a myth that we were a 'hi-fi band signed to a hi-fi company'. We just got lucky that we'd found our way to an excellent engineer who knew the company." The engineer in question was Calum Malcolm, with whom the band had already recorded some demos in his Castlesound studio near Edinburgh. Since Malcolm was a friend of Linn's founder Ivor Tiefenbrun, and had ties with the company, his studio was fitted out with Linn equipment. When Linn representatives visited one day and asked to hear some music to test out their new speakers, Malcolm played them the demo of "Tinseltown in the Rain". Impressed, Linn offered the band a contract with the record label it was in the process of setting up. Despite the fact that the group took nine months to reply to Linn's offer, the contract was eventually signed and its first album, A Walk Across the Rooftops, was released as Linn Records' first album in May 1984.

On its release, A Walk Across the Rooftops gained widespread acclaim from music critics for its mixture of sparse, detailed electronic sounds and Buchanan's soulful vocals, later described as a "fusion of chilly technology and a pitch of confessional, romantic soul". In 1984, the band gained greater exposure in Europe, with the videos for their two singles, "Stay" and "Tinseltown in the Rain", often shown on the video channel Music Box. The band's profile began to grow, although its existence remained precarious. Buchanan commented, "I've always found it strange that people missed the 'punk' aspect of A Walk Across the Rooftops. We were living in a flat in Glasgow with no hot water. We barely knew what we were doing and that was very liberating."

Hats (1985–1990)
Keen to capitalise on the positive critical reception awarded to A Walk Across the Rooftops, Linn sent the band back to Castlesound studio early in 1985 to produce a quick follow-up record. However, as the band later admitted, there was no new material ready to record, and they were not happy with the songs they were producing under pressure in the studio. The lack of progress led to stress and arguments among the band members, and matters were not helped when Virgin Records, to whom Linn had licensed the band's records, began legal proceedings against the group and the label for not producing the new material stipulated in the licensing agreement. After two years with almost nothing to show for its efforts, the band was forced to leave the studio to make way for another band, and had to return home to Glasgow. Away from the pressures of the studio, the group overcame the writer's block and, eventually returning to Castlesound in 1988, was able to rapidly complete a new album.

Hats was released in October 1989 to rave reviews, including a rare five-star rating from Q magazine. Warmer and smoother sounding than the first album, and exploring the highs and lows of romantic love, Hats peaked at #12 on the UK Albums Chart. It was also the group's breakthrough record in the US, where it reached #108 on the US Billboard 200 album charts in May 1990. All three singles released in the UK from the album made the top 75 in the UK Singles Chart.

The Blue Nile's first live public performance after making A Walk Across the Rooftops was in December 1989 on the television programme Halfway to Paradise, a Scottish-based arts magazine show broadcast on Channel 4. The band also composed and performed the theme tune for the programme, later released as a single B-side. The band played two songs with the American singer Rickie Lee Jones (who had recently befriended the band and had become one of its biggest supporters), performing her own "Flying Cowboys" and the Blue Nile's "Easter Parade". The duet version of "Easter Parade" was used as the B-side of both Jones's 1990 single, "Don't Let the Sun Catch You Crying", and the 12" single of "Headlights on the Parade". During 1990, the Blue Nile supported Jones on her US tour (their experience in America was filmed by BBC Scotland for a documentary titled Flags and Fences), followed by a tour of the UK culminating in two homecoming gigs in September 1990 at the Glasgow Royal Concert Hall, becoming the first non-classical band to play at the newly opened venue.

Peace at Last (1991–1996)
The radio play gained by Hats in the US, in particular the single "The Downtown Lights", brought the Blue Nile to the attention of several well-known US-based musicians. In 1991, the band was invited to Los Angeles to work on songs by Julian Lennon, Robbie Robertson and Michael McDonald. As a result, Buchanan moved to Los Angeles and lived there for a while, and had a relationship with the actress Rosanna Arquette between 1991 and 1993. Speaking about that period of his life Buchanan said, "It really was interesting. I have to say it was lived in all earnest ... And there was much good there, I enjoyed it, I really enjoyed it ... The great thing all the time was you were constantly wanting to phone friends and say, Guess who's in the shop? Guess who's in the supermarket? I'm not immune to all that. In the movies—celluloid's better than life isn't it? It makes everything glossy. I don't mean it's better, but it's so glamorous, I met lots of people—it was fascinating." The band also worked on Annie Lennox's first solo album, Diva, co-writing the track "The Gift". Lennox later covered "The Downtown Lights" (from Hats) for her second album, Medusa, released in 1995.

Having been let go by Linn and Virgin Records, the group signed a deal with Warner Bros. Records in 1992, although it later transpired that Buchanan had made the deal by himself without informing his bandmates. His explanation was that "none of the others were in town at the time". The band decided that it wanted to find somewhere private to record its new album with its portable studio, and began travelling around Europe searching for suitable locations. Having spent two years looking at and dismissing locations in cities such as Venice, Amsterdam and Copenhagen, the record was finally recorded piecemeal over three locations in Paris, Dublin and Los Angeles.

In June 1996, seven years after Hats, the Blue Nile released a third album, entitled Peace at Last. It displayed a marked difference in style to the first two albums, with Buchanan's acoustic guitar work more to the fore. Buchanan recalled that he had bought the guitar in a New York music shop, and by coincidence Robert Bell had seen the guitar earlier the same day and called Buchanan to tell him about it. A gospel choir made a brief appearance on the first single, "Happiness". Despite the release of Peace at Last on a major label, critical reaction to the album was more mixed than for the band's previous records, although sales were good, entering the UK album chart at #13.

High (1997–2004)
In 1997, the Blue Nile appointed a full-time manager for the first time - the experienced ex-Dire Straits manager, Ed Bicknell - who extricated the group from the deal with Warner Bros. He also attempted to persuade the band to change its recording habits, but had little success. Bicknell parted ways with the band in 2004, later saying that "in terms of the modern recording world the history of the Blue Nile was the most screwed-up I had ever encountered". Following tour dates in 1996 and 1997, culminating in an appearance at the Glastonbury Festival in June 1997, the Blue Nile disappeared from public view for the next seven years, apart from an appearance at a 2001 tribute concert at the Olympia Theatre in Dublin for the Irish music presenter Uaneen Fitzsimons, following her death in a car crash. A remixed version of the single "Tinseltown in the Rain" was used as the theme song for the BBC Scotland TV series Tinsel Town, broadcast in 2000 and 2001.

After the longest period yet between albums, the Blue Nile released High in August 2004. Part of the lengthy delay in making the record was due to Buchanan contracting a form of chronic fatigue syndrome which affected his health for two years, but as he explained on the album's release, it was mostly a result of the band's perfectionism taking hold once again, "We recorded an album and a half and ... we realised we weren't in love with it ... The vast majority of it we just dumped; we just put it to one side and didn't touch it any more." The album reached number 10 on the UK Albums Chart, the highest position to date for the band. Although acoustic guitar is still present on some tracks, the overall musical sound is more reminiscent of Hats.

Rift and subsequent activity (2005–present)
It became apparent during the recording of High that old tensions among the band members had resurfaced. Buchanan's comments in a 2012 interview seemed to indicate that the album was finished out of a sense of duty and loyalty rather than any willingness to do so. "When we eventually finished High, I don't think it was bristling with the same joy and naivety we'd felt when we started. We'd gathered ourselves long enough to make it. It seemed to me a stoic record, to some extent a record about ourselves, though I didn't realise that 'til later. It was a collected and fairly stoic record which I was proud of and, in a sense, we just made ourselves focus. We showed up, we went into the room and worked, and whatever drift had set in we were loyal to each other and we knew we had to form the wagons into a circle."

During preparations for the tour in February 2005 following the album's release, Buchanan and Bell realised that Moore had stopped contacting them and would not be showing up for the tour. Although in interviews around the time Buchanan brushed aside questions about Moore's absence and insisted that they remained friends, he acknowledged years later that in fact he and Bell have had virtually no contact with Moore since the recording of High.

Buchanan and Bell toured England and Scotland in May and June 2006, followed by Scotland and Ireland in November 2006, billed as "Paul Buchanan sings the songs of the Blue Nile", refraining from simply calling themselves the Blue Nile as a mark of respect for Moore's absence. The band consisted of Buchanan on vocals and guitar, Bell on bass guitar and keyboards, Alan Cuthbertson and Brendan Smith on keyboards, Stuart McCredie on guitar, and Liam Bradley on drums. On 14 July 2007, Buchanan and Bell played at the Bridgewater Hall in Manchester as part of the Manchester International Festival. In July 2008, the band played shows at the Glasgow Royal Concert Hall, Somerset House in London and the Radisson Hotel in Galway.

Although there has never been an official statement to clarify whether or not the Blue Nile still exists, the indications are that the band has split up. There appears to be disagreement among the band members themselves as to whether they will ever make another record together. Moore is emphatic that he will never rejoin the band, saying in communications sent in 2010 to the band's biographer that he was "finding it healthier to put all that behind me", and in a 2013 interview his terse reply to the question of a reunion was, "I think stuff happened that was simply beyond the pale. It's a shame, but if the feeling for sitting down together really isn't there, then continuing to do so even because you want to is pointless." On the other hand, Buchanan has not given up hope that the three members of the Blue Nile may make more music together in the future, saying, "I don't know where things stand with the other two guys ... In a way, I think it would be the right and proper thing to do but I'll just need to wait and see. If the others say let's do this ... Certainly, if I bump into them on a corner my hope would be that we could say: so what are you doing tomorrow?" He also lamented the estrangement with Moore, saying, "We're inhibited by the Scottish male thing where you have to give the other guy space, but I love PJ and there isn't a month goes by where I don't think about phoning him".

In September 2010, a biography of the Blue Nile by the Scottish journalist Allan Brown, titled Nileism: The Strange Course of the Blue Nile, was published. Although Brown was a long-time acquaintance of Buchanan, he found Buchanan reluctant to participate, and both Bell and Moore refused Brown's invitations for interviews or any co-operation with the book's writing.

In May 2012, Buchanan released his first solo album, Mid Air, a collection of short, stripped-back songs mostly with just Buchanan's voice and piano, recorded with Calum Malcolm's son Cameron as the album's engineer and released on Buchanan's own Newsroom Records label. In a radio interview, Buchanan mentioned that towards the end of the recording process he had called in Robert Bell to help out on two tracks ("Mid Air" and "My True Country") that neither he nor Cameron Malcolm were satisfied with. Bell also later remixed "Buy a Motor Car", which appeared on the deluxe edition of the album released in October 2012. The album peaked at number 14 on the UK Albums Chart of 2 June 2012, and its title track, "Mid Air", was used a year later in the Richard Curtis film, About Time.

In November 2012, Virgin Records released two-CD "Collector's Edition" versions of the band's first two albums, A Walk Across the Rooftops and Hats. Each version had the original album remastered by engineer Calum Malcolm, along with a bonus disc of rare and previously unreleased material selected by Buchanan and Bell. A similar reissue of the third album, Peace at Last, was released on 3 March 2014.

In July 2016, Buchanan took part in the David Bowie Prom at the Royal Albert Hall, performing "Ashes to Ashes", "I Can't Give Everything Away" and, as a duet with Laura Mvula, "Girl Loves Me".

In 2019, the band's major label albums were re-issued on vinyl, with a re-issue of High charting at number 74 in the UK charts after being released by Confetti Records on 5 June 2020 as vinyl or double CD edition.

Legacy 
The band has influenced future musicians such as Duncan Sheik, who covered the song "Stay", as well as Wild Beasts. The 1975 lead singer Matt Healy labeled The Blue Nile his "favorite band of all time" and declared Hats to be his "favorite record of the ‘80s." Healy would describe The 1975's 2018 song "Love It If We Made It" as the "Blue Nile on steroids", while critics drew comparisons between the song's construction and that of "The Downtown Lights".

Discography

Albums

Singles

Unreleased material
Four unreleased tracks from the Rooftops and Hats sessions can be found on bootleg recordings. These include:
 "St Catherine's Day"
 "Christmas"
 "Young Club"
 "Broadway in the Snow"

The first two of these were subsequently included on the deluxe releases of the first two albums.

An instrumental version of "Stay Close" from High was available as an MP3 download from the band's website. The remixed version of "Soul Boy" that appeared on the "She Saw The World" single was also available as an MP3 download.

A remixed version of "Tinseltown in the Rain" was used as the theme music for the BBC Scotland drama series Tinsel Town.

Buchanan played a number of new tracks in his 2006 solo shows which are regarded by many fans as unreleased Blue Nile songs. These can be found on live bootlegs, and include:
 "Runaround Girl"
 "Meanwhile"
 "Start Again"

Paul Buchanan solo records
 Mid Air (Newsroom, 2012)

Collaborations with other artists

 Julian Lennon – Help Yourself (1991): the track "Other Side of Town" features vocals by Buchanan, written by Buchanan and Bell
 Robbie Robertson – Storyville (1991): the track "Breakin' the Rules" features vocals and guitar by Buchanan and bass guitar and drum programming by Bell; the track "Sign of the Rainbow" features bass guitar by Bell. Paul Joseph Moore (as Paul Moore) plays keyboards on four of the songs, including "Breakin' the Rules", on which he also does the drum programming.
 Nicky Holland – Nicky Holland (1992): the track "Running Around Again" produced and co-written by Bell
Rickie Lee Jones – "Easter Parade"
Annie Lennox – Diva (1992): the track "The Gift" co-written by Annie Lennox and the Blue Nile
 Michael McDonald – Blink of an Eye (1993): the track "I Want You" written and produced by Paul Buchanan & Robert Bell 
 The Devlins – Drift (1993): the track "I Don't Want to Be Like This" produced by Bell
 Matraca Berg – The Speed of Grace (1994): the track "Let's Face It" written by Buchanan
 Máire Brennan – Misty Eyed Adventures (1995): the track "Big Yellow Taxi" produced by the Blue Nile
 Chris Botti – Midnight Without You (1997): the track "Midnight Without You" features the Blue Nile, written by Chris Botti, Buchanan and Moore
 Peter Gabriel – OVO (2000): the tracks "Downside Up" and "Make Tomorrow" feature vocals by Paul Buchanan
 Quiet City (aka the Blue Nile's drummer Nigel Thomas) – Public Face, Private Face (2002): the tracks "Due North" and "Things We Should Say" feature vocals by Buchanan
 Texas – Red Book (2005): the track "Sleep" features vocals by Buchanan
 Michael Brook – RockPaperScissors (2006): the track "RockPaperScissors" features vocals by Buchanan
 Aqualung – Memory Man (2007): the track "Garden of Love" features vocals by Buchanan
 Paula Cole – Courage (2007): the track "Until I Met You" features vocals by Buchanan
 Various Artists – Seasons of Light Christmas album (2007): the tracks "Seasons of Light" and "Silent Night" feature vocals by Buchanan
 Robin Danar – Altered States (2008): the track "Message of Love" features vocals by Buchanan (cover version of the Pretenders song)
 Aqualung – Magnetic North (2010): the track "36 Hours" co-written by Matt Hales and Paul Buchanan
 Up Dharma Down – Capacities (2012): the track "Feelings" features vocals by Buchanan
Craig Armstrong – The Space Between Us (1998) a new version of the track "Let's Go Out Tonight" by The Blue Nile is performed by Buchanan with Craig Armstrong
 Craig Armstrong – It's Nearly Tomorrow (2014) — two tracks featuring vocals by Buchanan: "All Around Love" and "It's Not Alright"
 Jessie Ware – Glasshouse (2017): the track "Last of The True Believers" features vocals by Buchanan

References

Bibliography

External links
 Official website
 Unofficial website
 Fan website

Musical groups established in 1981
Musical groups from Glasgow
Scottish art rock groups
British musical trios
British synth-pop new wave groups
Scottish new wave musical groups
Scottish pop music groups
Sophisti-pop musical groups
RSO Records artists
Virgin Records artists
Warner Records artists
Sanctuary Records artists